Jack Porter Gibbs (August 26, 1927 – August 20, 2020) was an American sociologist known for his work on social control theory and deterrence. In the early 1960s, he and Leonard Broom helped plan the founding of the Population Research Center at the University of Texas at Austin, which was founded in 1963. A 2015 book described Gibbs as "a giant of his time".

References

External links
Faculty page

1927 births
2020 deaths
American criminologists
Vanderbilt University faculty
University of Texas at Austin faculty
University of Oregon alumni
Place of birth missing